Muan International Airport  is an airport in Muan County, Jeollanam-do, South Korea. Construction of the airport began in 1997 and the airport opened on November 9, 2007. The airport serves the province of Jeollanam-do, especially the cities of Gwangju, Mokpo and Naju. It replaced the nearby Mokpo Airport and is expected to replace the nearby Gwangju Airport in the near future as well. In 2018, 543,247 passengers used the airport. The airport is managed by the Korea Airports Corporation.

Airlines and destinations

Statistics

See also 

 Transportation in South Korea

References

External links 
 Muan Airport 
 Muan Airport (English)

Buildings and structures in South Jeolla Province
Airports in South Korea
Muan County
Airports established in 2007
2007 establishments in South Korea